Vamsi Krishna is an Indian actor who predominantly works in Telugu and Tamil films. He made his debut in Gharshana (2004) and went on to play the antagonist in films including Thadaiyara Thaakka (2012) and Ivan Veramathiri (2013).

Film career
The director offered him a supporting role as a police officer in Gharshana (2004) and Krishna allotted 40 days to the project and subsequently decided to make a career in films. He played the lead role in the  2006 Telugu film Oka `V` Chitram alongside Aadhi. He subsequently played roles in films including Darling (2010), Nagavalli (2010), Nenu Naa Rakshasi (2011) and Attarintiki Daredi (2013).

Filmography

Film

References

External links 
 

Indian male film actors
Male actors in Tamil cinema
Male actors in Telugu cinema
Male actors in Kannada cinema
Living people
1986 births